Strachówka  is a village in Wołomin County, Masovian Voivodeship, in east-central Poland. It is the seat of the gmina (administrative district) called Gmina Strachówka.

The village has a population of 390.

References

Villages in Wołomin County